"I'm a Fool" is a short story by American writer Sherwood Anderson. It was first published in the February 1922 issue of The Dial (followed the next month by the London Mercury), and later, in 1923 as the first story in Anderson's short-story collection Horses and Men. Of that collection, William Faulkner wrote that "...I think, next to Heart of Darkness by Conrad that the first story, 'I'm a Fool,' is the best short story I ever read."

The story is narrated in first person point of view and the setting is Ohio, where Sherwood Anderson was born.

Adaptations 

An adaptation of the story was performed by Orson Welles and Nancy Gates on the September 29, 1941, broadcast of CBS Radio's The Orson Welles Show.

James Dean, Natalie Wood and Eddie Albert starred in a live TV play on the series General Electric Theater, hosted by Ronald Reagan.

In 1977, Noel Black made a 38-minute movie based on Anderson's story, keeping its title i.e. "I'm a Fool". In this movie, Ron Howard starred as the groom and Amy Irving played the role of the pretty girl Miss Lucy Wessen.

References

Sources
 Anderson Sherwood (1922). "I'm a Fool". The Dial 72(2): 119-129.
 Cohen, Philip (1993). "'This hand holds genius': three unpublished Faulkner letters". Mississippi Quarterly 46(3): 479-83.

External links
 
 The Full Text of the Story
 The Persian Translation of the Story

American short stories
1922 short stories
Short stories adapted into films
Short stories by Sherwood Anderson